Radel Fazleyev (born 7 January 1996) is a Russian professional ice hockey forward who currently plays for Neftyanik Almetievsk of the Supreme Hockey League (VHL). He was drafted in the sixth round of the 2014 NHL Entry Draft by the Philadelphia Flyers.

Playing career
Fazleyev signed a three-year entry-level contract with the Flyers on 28 May 2015 and played three seasons with their American Hockey League affiliate the Lehigh Valley Phantoms. Midway through his third season with the Phantoms, Fazleyev agreed to a mutual termination of the final year of his contract and he signed with Ak Bars Kazan on 25 December 2018.

In the 2019-20 season, Fazleev initially began with HC Neftekhimik Nizhnekamsk, appearing in 14 games before returning in a trade to the Ak Bars Kazan organization. He was unable to solidify a role within Ak Bars and was released as a free agent at the conclusion of the VHL season.

On 26 June 2020, Fazleev was signed to a one-year contract to continue in the VHL with Neftyanik Almetievsk.

Career statistics

Regular season and playoffs

International

References

External links

1996 births
Living people
Calgary Hitmen players
HC Neftekhimik Nizhnekamsk players
Lehigh Valley Phantoms players
Philadelphia Flyers draft picks
Reading Royals players
Russian ice hockey forwards
Sportspeople from Kazan